Cẩm Mỹ is a rural district of Đồng Nai province in the Southeast region of Vietnam. As of 2003 the district had a population of 148,823. The district covers an area of 468 km². The district capital lies at Long Giao.

References

Districts of Đồng Nai province